Sir Gerald Clayton Beadle (17 April 1899 – 6 November 1976) was a British announcer and administrator for BBC Radio, and later Director of BBC Television.

Life 
Beadle was born in Belvedere, Kent, to Clayton Beadle (1868–1917), a chemist, and Helen Pears Beadle.

He joined the BBC in 1923, as a radio announcer. He left in 1924 and rejoined in 1926 as station director in Belfast. He moved to the television team in 1936. He was instrumental in establishing the BBC's Television Centre, in London.

He was knighted in December 1960.

He appeared as a castaway on the BBC Radio programme Desert Island Discs on 30 October 1961.

His portrait, a 1961 photograph by Walter Bird, is in the National Portrait Gallery.

He died on 6 November 1976.

Bibliography

References

External links 

 Cactus Pryor Interviews Sir Gerald Beadle Video of 1961 TV programme, with Cactus Pryor

1899 births
1976 deaths
People from Belvedere, London
BBC radio presenters
BBC Television
Knights Bachelor